Cornelis Bloemaert II (1603 – 28 September 1692), was a Dutch Golden Age painter and engraver.

Biography
Bloemaert was born at Utrecht.  He studied with his father, Abraham Bloemaert, his brothers Hendrick and Adriaan, and his father's pupil, Gerard van Honthorst. Though originally trained as a painter, he devoted himself primarily to printmaking, which he learned from Crispijn van de Passe. He went to Paris in 1630, where he made engravings from among others, Michel de Marolles's Temple des Muses, before going to Rome in 1633.  His chisel can be recognised by the colours' richness and the smoothness of their transitions. Amongst his pupils were Michel Natalis and Gilles Rousselet. Some of his better known engravings are of Annibale Carracci's The Holy Family, Pietro da Cortona's Adoration of the Shepherds, and Rubens' Meleager.

According to Houbraken he traveled to Rome, where he made prints of many Italian paintings. During 1664-1677, working with Charles de la Haye, he completed engraving of the Pietro da Cortona frescoes in the Palazzo Pitti, published as Heroicae Virtutes Imagines quas eques Petrus Beretinus pinxit Florentiae (1677).

In 1659 and 1667 he did frontispiece engravings for Daniello Bartoli's Istoria della Compagnia di Gesu. He was so successful that he stayed there until receiving word that his father wished to see him once more before he died. He delayed his return so long, that his father died, so he remained in Rome until his own death. He was a member of the Bentvueghels with the nickname Winter.

References

External links
Vermeer and The Delft School, a full text exhibition catalog from The Metropolitan Museum of Art, which contains material on Cornelis Bloemaert

1603 births
1692 deaths
17th-century engravers
Dutch engravers
Dutch Golden Age painters
Dutch male painters
Artists from Utrecht
Members of the Bentvueghels
Bloemaert family